The dhal is a type of shield found in the Indian subcontinent. They are nearly always geometrically round and yet they vary in diameter from about eight inches to twenty-four inches. Some are nearly flat while others are strongly convex or curved.  The edges may be flat or rolled back in the reverse direction to that of the curvature of the shield. Dhal shields were either made from metal or hide.

Materials
Leather shields were made from a great variety of animals found in the Indian subcontinent. The hide shields were made from either water buffalo, sambar deer, Indian elephant, or Indian rhinoceros. The rhinoceros shields were the most prized variant among leather shields.

Construction

References

External links
 
 Horsham Museum website with collections database access

shields
Military equipment of India